The Euroscar European Player of the Year Award is an annual basketball award given to the year's best male European basketball player. Its name is a portmanteau of Europe and Oscar, and the award is often referred to as "European basketball’s Oscar”.

Any player with European citizenship is eligible for the award, regardless of his current club. The award is judged on the basis of both sports club and national team performances and accomplishments. The honor is presented the January after the calendar year it is awarded for, i.e. the 2011 award was presented in 2012. It was first given out in 1979 to Soviet center Vladimir Tkachenko, and has since then been routinely given to players who fared well in international competitions such as the EuroBasket, FIBA World Cup or Olympic Games. As of 2020, the most recent winner is Slovenian player Luka Dončić. Lithuanian center Arvydas Sabonis and German power forward Dirk Nowitzki hold the record for most wins with six each.

The Euroscar is decided upon by a committee composed of general managers, coaches, players, sportswriters from 33 different countries. The award is presented by the Italian newspaper La Gazzetta dello Sport. It is one of the two main player of the year awards that any European basketball player can currently receive, along with Eurobasket.com's All-Europe Player of the Year. Previously, there was also the official FIBA Europe Men's Player of the Year Award (2005–2014), and Italian magazine's Superbasket Mr. Europa Award (1976–2010).

History and distinctions
The Euroscar was first awarded in 1979, and 21 of the first 23 winners were born in the Soviet Union or Yugoslavia. Thereafter, Dirk Nowitzki of Germany and Pau Gasol of Spain won ten times between them, and  an Eastern European has won the award only four times in the past twenty years.

The early winners of the Euroscar played primarily for EuroLeague clubs. Since Dražen Petrović won his third award in 1992, while playing for the New Jersey Nets, only four Euroscar winners (Sabonis in 1995, Gregor Fučka in 2000, Kirilenko in 2012, and Teodosić in 2016) played in a European league during the year they won the award, and only Fučka and Teodosić did not play in the NBA for any part of their award-winning years.

, three players have won five or more Euroscars: Sabonis (six), Nowitzki (six), and Toni Kukoč (five). Nowitzki holds the record for most consecutive wins with five. Seven Euroscar winners have been inducted into the FIBA Hall of Fame: Tkachenko, Sabonis, Petrović, Dražen Dalipagić, Dino Meneghin, Dragan Kićanović and Nikos Galis. Sabonis, Petrović, Dalipagić, Galis and Meneghin are also in the Naismith Memorial Basketball Hall of Fame. One pair of brothers have each won the award: the Spaniards Pau and Marc Gasol. As of the 2019–20 basketball season, the Gasols, Antetokounmpo, Goran Dragić and Dončić are the only award winners still active in the NBA. , Nowitzki and Antetokounmpo are also the only players to win the Euroscar Award and the NBA Most Valuable Player Award, albeit in different seasons. Kukoč (1996, 1998), Nowitzki (2011), Parker (2007) and Pau Gasol (2009–10) all won NBA titles in their Euroscar-winning years; Kukoč and Gasol are the only players to do so more than once. Dalipagić (1980) and Sabonis (1988) won Olympic gold medals and a Euroscar in the same year.

Award winners

 
 
When a winner has played for more than one club team in the calendar year of his award, all are listed.

References
General

 
 

Specific

European basketball awards
Awards established in 1979